"In the Crossfire" is a song written by English post-Britpop band Starsailor that talks about the suffering of people who have lived the Iraq War. The song says "I hear them screaming on the radio, it's getting louder in the crossfire, trying to find some hope from the ashes of their broken homes".

This is the first political song of the band which denounced the alliance of Prime Minister Tony Blair with president George W. Bush (I don't see myself when I look at the flag) during the war on Iraq. It peaked at number 22 on the UK Singles Chart.

"In the Crossfire" shows a more mature and heavier-sounding Starsailor, unique from what they have done before.  Noticeably, it shows a marked distance between the sound of other britpop groups like Coldplay.

Video 
"In the Crossfire" was directed by Paul Gore and shows the band playing in a disused railway station in London creating a serious atmosphere with it.

They're locked in a greenhouse for almost all the video after they finally break it with the sound of the guitars.  This is the darkest video of their career and it accentuates the heavier sound that they would present to the world with the release of their third album On the Outside.

Track listings

CD, 7" 
"In the Crossfire"
"Always"

DVD 
"In the Crossfire" (video)
"Four to the Floor" (live at Somerset House - video)
"In the Crossfire" (audio)
"Empty Streets" (audio)

Charts

References 

2005 singles
Starsailor (band) songs
Songs written by James Walsh (musician)
Songs written by James Stelfox
Songs written by Barry Westhead
Songs written by Ben Byrne
2005 songs
Political songs
Protest songs
Anti-war songs
EMI Records singles